Alexander G Khristiani (22 October 1871 – 1 November 1914) was an officer of the Imperial Russian Army in World War I.

Life and career
Alexander Khristiani graduated from The Second Saint Petersburg Gymnasium in 1890 and the 2nd military Konstantinovsky school in 1892, he exited as Podporuchik in the Lifeguard Jaeger Regiment.

Ranks: Poruchik (1895), Staff Captain of the Guard with renaming as Captains of the General Staff (1898), Podpolkovnik (1902), Colonel (1907).

1898 he graduated from the General Staff Academy (Imperial Russia) with a silver medal (1st category).

He served as senior adjutant to the headquarters of the 2nd Guards Infantry Division (Russian Empire) in 1900 and the 1st Army Corps (Russian Empire) during 1900–1902. In 1900–1901, he served the censored company command in the Lifeguard Jaeger Regiment. 1902, he was the Chief Officer for assignments at the headquarters of the troops of the Guard and the Petersburg Military District (Russian Empire).

He served as a Headquarters Officer for special assignments at the Headquarters of the Guards Corps during 1902–1908. In 1906, he served the censored command of the battalion in the Life Guards Rifle Regiment. During 1908–1913, he remained the Chief of the Staff of the 1st Guards Infantry Division.

On 31 July 1913, he was appointed as the Commander of the 199th Kronstadt Infantry Regiment, with which he entered the First World War.

Martyrdom
Khristiani attained martyrdom on 1 November 1914 and was awarded the St. George Sword posthumously in 1915.

“He commanded his regiment in a battle in November 1914. Despite being under strong artillery and rifle fire from the enemy side and being wounded in the arm, he continued to defend them and lead the battle. He led his regiment to counter-attack against the advancing enemy thereby, setting an example of courage and valor to other ranks of the regiment. While carrying out an attack for the second time he became seriously injured, and ultimately martyred.”

He was buried in Pavlovsk, Saint Petersburg.

Awards
Order of Saint Stanislaus (House of Romanov), 3rd Art. (1899)
Order of St. Anna, 3rd art. (1902);
Order of Saint Stanislaus (House of Romanov), 2nd art. (1905);
Order of St. Anna, 2nd art. (1910);
Order of St. Vladimir 4th art. (1913);
St. George Sword (posthumously, 18 March 1915)

References
 (in Russian)

Sources
"Military Order of the Holy Great Martyr and Victorious George. Biobibliographic Reference" RGVIA, M., 2004.
List of senior military commanders, chiefs of staff: districts, corps and divisions and commanders of individual combat units. St. Petersburg. Military Printing House. 1913.
List of the General Staff. Fixed on 6 January 1914. Petrograd, 1914
Photo from the weekly supplement to the newspaper "New Time" No. 13908 of 29 November 1914.
"New time" for 1914. Information provided by Ilya Mukhin (Moscow)
Russian disabled person. No. 267, 1914 // Information provided by Konstantin Podlessky
VP for the military department // Scout No. 1279, 5 December 1915

External links
 

1871 births
1914 deaths
Russian military personnel of World War I
Recipients of the Gold Sword for Bravery
Recipients of the Order of St. Anna, 2nd class
Recipients of the Order of St. Anna, 3rd class
Recipients of the Order of Saint Stanislaus (Russian), 2nd class
Recipients of the Order of Saint Stanislaus (Russian), 3rd class
Recipients of the Order of St. Vladimir, 4th class
Russian military personnel killed in World War I